Stéphane Pizella (1909–1970) was a French journalist and screenwriter.

Selected filmography
 The Island of Love (1944)

1909 births
1970 deaths
French radio presenters
French screenwriters
People from Corte, Haute-Corse
French male non-fiction writers
20th-century French journalists
20th-century French male writers